Fernando Sidimar Cigolini, better known as Sidimar, is a Brazilian footballer, who plays as a central defender for Goiás.

Career
It was a constant presence on the lists of call for selections based on both the juvenile and the junior. On March 29, 2010, the player has joined the cast of professional Atlético.

Career statistics

(Correct )

Contract
 Atlético Mineiro.

References

External links
 Galo Digital
 uol

1992 births
Living people
Brazilian footballers
Brazil youth international footballers
Association football central defenders
Campeonato Brasileiro Série A players
Campeonato Brasileiro Série B players
Campeonato Brasileiro Série C players
Clube Atlético Mineiro players
Villa Nova Atlético Clube players
Madureira Esporte Clube players
Ipatinga Futebol Clube players
Tupi Football Club players
Esporte Clube Juventude players
Oeste Futebol Clube players
Goiás Esporte Clube players